The Canadian Language Benchmarks (CLB), or Niveaux de compétence linguistique canadien (NCLC) in French, comprise a 12-point scale of task-based language proficiency descriptors used to guide the teaching and assessment of ESL learners in Canada. Like the Common European Framework of Reference for Languages and the ACTFL Proficiency Guidelines, the Canadian Language Benchmarks describe ESL learners' successive levels of communicative achievement. 
The CLB's 12 benchmarks are divided into 3 parts: Stage I: Basic Proficiency; Stage II: Intermediate Proficiency; and Stage III: Advanced Proficiency. The CLB cover four skills: listening, speaking, reading, writing. There is also a French version of the CLB. The theory behind the CLB can be found in the document, the THEORETICAL FRAMEWORK FOR THE CANADIAN LANGUAGE BENCHMARKS AND NIVEAUX DE COMPÉTENCE LINGUISTIQUE CANADIENS (at http://bookshelf.language.ca)  and includes pragmatic knowledge, grammatical knowledge, textual knowledge, functional knowledge, and sociolinguistic knowledge.

Each benchmark is then described in terms of "Can do" statements or "Performance Descriptors". For example, the following are two task descriptors for Benchmark 5 in writing (from the 2012 version of the CLB):

Descriptor: Write short business or service correspondence for routine personal needs. 
[Writing is about 1 paragraph.]
Example: Write a paragraph to report a 
factual event or incident, such 
as an accident, a workplace 
incident or a burglary.

Descriptor: Write a paragraph to relate a familiar sequence of events, description of a person, object 
or routine.

Write a paragraph for a class 
newsletter to inform readers 
about a new or useful service in 
the community (such as a new 
language class, community 
centre, childcare centre or food 
bank).

Because such descriptor systems focus on the successful completion of communicative tasks, rather than on a strict emphasis on correct linguistic forms, they have quickly gained in popularity among proponents of task-based language learning (TBLL).

History 

The CLB grew out of a federal government initiative undertaken in 1992, to support the language learning needs of immigrants to the country. In 1993, Citizenship and Immigration Canada established the National Working Group on Language Benchmarks. In November 1996, the group published the Canadian Language Benchmarks (Working Document). This working group was eventually to become the Board of Directors of the Centre for Canadian Language Benchmarks.  The CCLB received its charter as a non-profit agency in March 1998. In 2000, the Canadian Language Benchmarks 2000, by Grazyna Pawlikowska-Smith, was published. It was the culmination of years of work by dozens of experts, and has since steadily grown in popularity with students, teachers and institutions.

In 2012, a revised version of the CLB was published and an updated theoretical framework. A team of writers and language experts worked on the revision in both English and in French. The CLB/NCLC theory was validated against the Common European Framework for Language, the ACTEFL and the Quebec version of the benchmarks. The validation showed that the CLB and NCLC are valid and reliable for high-stakes use in a variety of contexts including community, academic and workplace.

A set of benchmarks for literacy learners who have English as a Second Language was also first developed in 1996 and revised in 2000 by the Government of Manitoba. A revised version of the literacy benchmarks was done in fiscal 2013-2014 and expected to be released once validation is complete in 2014. See CLB 2000: ESL for Literacy Learners

The CLB has also been used to identify the level of curricula, courses and requirements for entry into post-secondary training in some parts of Canada, e.g. in Manitoba, some Ontario community colleges and in British Columbia where it is part of an articulation agreement. See work done by CIITE.

Since 2002, the CLB has been used increasingly as a scale to help define the language demands that are used in some occupations and professions. The first benchmarking projects were done at the provincial level by Red River College in Manitoba. In 2002, CCLB did the first national benchmarking project to identify the language demands of the nursing profession. This was followed by the development of a national test to verify the language competency of internationally trained nurses, the Canadian English Language Benchmarks Assessment for Nurses (CELBAN). Further research was done by the Centre for occupations in the following industries: Travel and hospitality, Trucking, Trades, Food and Grocery, and professions like Pharmacy, Physiotherapy and Occupational Therapy, Audiology and Speech Language Pathology. Many of these profiles  have been captured in documents called "Occupational Language Analyses" (OLAs) which reflect the communication skills extrapolated from occupational competency documents, the Essential Skills and aligned to the CLB/NCLC. Many of these are available on the website, Canadian Language Benchmarks and Essential Skills for the workplace or by contacting the CCLB.  The CLB has also been correlated to the Essential Skills in a document called the Relating Canadian Language Benchmarks to the Essential Skills.

CLB and Assessment 

The CLB has been used since 1996 as the background of CLB-based assessments. CLB-based assessments reflect what a second language speaker can demonstrate in terms of language and communication. They usually cover the four skills: listening, speaking, reading and writing. the CLB have been used for both formative and summative assessment and are defined for low-stakes or higher stakes uses.

Examples of CLB assessments include:

 The Canadian Language Benchmarks Assessment (CLBA)
 The Canadian Language Benchmarks Literacy Assessment (CLBLA)
 The Canadian Language Benchmarks Placement Test (CLBPT)
 Literacy Placement Tool: Volume I
 Literacy Placement Tool: Volume II
 Canadian English Language Benchmarks Assessment for Nurses (CELBAN)
 Milestones (a high-stakes test in development for Citizenship & Immigration Canada)

Classroom assessment resources for instructors include:
 Summative Assessment Manual (SAM)
 Exit Tasks for CLB 5 - 10
 Integrating Assessment into the CLB Classroom
 Portfolio-based language assessment (PBLA)
 Can Do Statements

CLB and Immigration Language Requirements 
Canada has strict language requirements for immigration. Federal Skilled Workers are expected to have a minimum CLB level 7 score in order to be eligible for immigration. Canada accepts popular English testing reports of IELTS-GT and CELPIP-G and French testing reports of TEF/TCF for immigration purposes. The bands have to be converted to CLB /NCLC equivalent levels using the below conversion chart or by using a CLB Calculator which converts IELTS/CELPIP-G/TEF/TCF scores to their CLB/NCLC equivalents:

Federal Skilled Worker Program 

Second official language: Minimum level of CLB or NCLC 5.

Canadian Experience Class

Federal Skilled Trades Program

See also 
 Task-based language learning
 CELPIP (Canadian English Language Proficiency Index Program)
 IELTS

References

External links 
 Canadian Language Benchmarks home
 Online Self-Assessment CLB-OSA
 Common European Framework home
 American Council on Teaching Foreign Languages home
 Canada CLB Calculator

Education in Canada
Language tests